Eupithecia sacrivicae is a moth in the family Geometridae. It is found in central and north-western China (Hubei, Shaanxi).

The wingspan is about 19–20 mm. The forewings are pale buff and the hindwings are white.

References

Moths described in 2004
sacrivicae
Moths of Asia